Gmina Adamów is a rural gmina (administrative district) in Łuków County, Lublin Voivodeship, in eastern Poland.

Neighbouring gminas
Gmina Adamów is bordered by the gminas of Jeziorzany, Krzywda, Nowodwór, Serokomla, Ułęż and Wojcieszków.

Villages
The gmina contains the following villages with the status of sołectwo: Adamów (divided into 2 sołectwos: Adamów I and Adamów II), Budziska, Dąbrówka, Ferdynandów, Gułów, Helenów, Hordzieżka, Kalinowy Dół, Konorzatka, Lipiny, Sobiska, Turzystwo, Władysławów, Wola Gułowska, Zakępie and Żurawiec.

There is one village without sołectwo status: Natalin, which belongs to the sołectwo of Żurawiec.

See also
 Gmina Adamów, Zamość County

References

Adamow L
Łuków County